Contagious reticulum cell sarcoma is a reticulum-cell sarcoma found in Syrian hamsters that can be transmitted from one hamster to another. It was first described in 1945.

Transmission from hamster to hamster can be through various mechanisms. It has been seen to spread within a laboratory population, presumably through gnawing at tumours and cannibalism. It can also be spread by means of the bite of the mosquito Aedes aegypti.

It is one of only three known transmissible cancers in mammals; the others are devil facial tumor disease, a cancer which occurs in Tasmanian devils, and canine transmissible venereal tumor in dogs and other canines. Unlike these other two, tumours with multiple, independent origins have been observed in laboratory populations of hamsters.

References

Types of animal cancers
Clonally transmissible cancers
Sarcoma